Pan Dah (c. September 1940 - October 31, 1951), also spelled Pan-dah, was a female giant panda captured in Western China and settled in New York's Bronx Zoo. 

In 1941, Soong May-ling, Chiang Kai-shek, presented two giant pandas, Pan Dah and Pan Dee, to the Bronx Zoo of the United States. The two giant pandas were used to demonstrate the non-Communist Chinese's love for the United States, especially for the Bronx.

On October 31, 1951, Pan Dah died at the Bronx Zoo.

See also
 Pan Dee
 Panda diplomacy

References

1940 animal births
1951 animal deaths
Individual giant pandas
Individual animals in Japan